Fernando Nicolás Meza (born 21 March 1990) is an Argentine professional footballer who plays as a defender for Liga MX club Necaxa.

Career
Meza made his league debut on 2 November 2008 in a 1-0 defeat to Boca Juniors aged 18.

In January 2009 Meza was selected to join the Argentina under-20 squad for the 2009 South American Youth Championship in Venezuela.

On January 10, 2020, Meza completed a transfer to Atlanta United FC of MLS, following a transfer to Club Tijuana to complete a player swap with Atlanta for Leandro González Pírez.

On February 18, 2021, Meza moved to Argentine Primera División side Defensa y Justicia, on a loan deal.

After 7 league appearances for Defensa y Justicia, Atlanta United and Meza mutually terminated his contract on July 23, 2021. On the same day Meza signed with his former club Necaxa in Liga MX.

On January 8, 2023, Fernando Meza has rejoined his former club Palestino in Chili.

Career statistics

Club

Honours

Club 
Colo-Colo
Primera División: 1
 Transición 2017
Supercopa de Chile: 1
 2017 Supercopa de Chile

References

External links
Fernando Meza – Argentine Primera statistics at Fútbol XXI  

1990 births
Living people
People from San Martín, Buenos Aires
Argentine footballers
Argentina under-20 international footballers
Argentine expatriate footballers
Association football defenders
San Lorenzo de Almagro footballers
Olimpo footballers
Colo-Colo footballers
San Marcos de Arica footballers
Club Deportivo Palestino footballers
Club Necaxa footballers
Atlanta United FC players
Chilean Primera División players
Argentine Primera División players
Liga MX players
Expatriate footballers in Chile
Expatriate footballers in Mexico
Expatriate soccer players in the United States
Argentine expatriate sportspeople in Chile
Argentine expatriate sportspeople in Mexico
Argentine expatriate sportspeople in the United States
Major League Soccer players
Sportspeople from Buenos Aires Province